MacDonald Park is a northern suburb of Adelaide, South Australia in the City of Playford. It is north and west of a bend in the Max Fatchen Expressway, bounded by Curtis Road and Heaslip Road on the north and west sides.

The suburb boundaries were adjusted on 2 June 2011 when the Max Fatchen Expressway was built so that suburbs did not span the expressway. The area south of Petherton Road changed from Penfield to Macdonald Park, and the area between the Expressway and Andrews Road changed from Macdonald Park to Andrews Farm. Some of the current suburb and part of the land transferred to Andrews Farm was formerly the Smithfield Munitions Store, which had been closed before the expressway was built across it. The Curtis Road interchange is also built on former munitions store land.

References

	

Suburbs of Adelaide